(born March 10, 1981) is a Japanese actor.

Early life
Sugiura was born in Okayama, Japan. He has a brother, Takao (太雄), who is two years younger. Sugiura attended Neyagawa 1st Junior High School (Neyagawa Middle School) and Osaka Sangyo University Senior High School, where he graduated from in 1999.

Career
Sugiura made his debut in 1998 with TV Asahi, where he appeared in several dramas. In 2001, he was cast in and starred for Ultraman Cosmos. This was followed by his appearance in the 2003 Ultraman Cosmos vs. Ultraman Justice: The Final Battle.

Personal life
On June 17, 2007, Sugiura married Nozomi Tsuji while she was three months pregnant; the marriage was confirmed to be a shotgun wedding. Sugiura and Tsuji met in April 2006 through mutual friends.

On September 15, 2020, Sugiura tested positive of COVID-19.

Filmography

References

1981 births
Living people
Japanese male actors